Erik Robert Johnson (born March 21, 1988) is an American ice hockey defenseman for the Colorado Avalanche of the National Hockey League (NHL). Nicknamed the "Condor", Johnson previously played for the St. Louis Blues, who selected him with the first overall pick in the 2006 NHL Entry Draft. Additionally, he has represented the United States in numerous tournaments. Johnson won the Stanley Cup with the Avalanche in 2022.

Johnson was drafted from USA Hockey's National Team Development Program and played one season at the University of Minnesota before joining the NHL with St. Louis in 2007. In 2011, he was traded to Colorado, where he has played ever since.

Playing career

Junior
Johnson played hockey for the Academy of Holy Angels in Richfield, Minnesota, where he starred in his two seasons as a freshman and sophomore at the prep school. In the 2003–04 season he led all defenseman in scoring with 13 goals and 34 points to be selected to the Missota All-Conference Team. As a 16-year old Johnson transferred to Ann Arbor, Michigan, to play for the National Team Development Program (NTDP).

In the 2004–05 season, he split time between the U.S. National under-17 and under-18 squads, compiling 26 points in 57 games, tops amongst defenseman. Having been scouted as being tailored to suit the professional ranks with his hybrid two-way style and physicality, Johnson continued his rise in development the following season with a team-leading 49 points in 47 games with the under-18's. While also having a major impact at the junior international stage, Johnson was selected first overall in the 2006 NHL Entry draft by the St. Louis Blues. He  became the first American-born defenseman to be selected first overall without having played Canadian major junior or collegiate hockey. He joined a select group of five (now eight following Patrick Kane, Auston Matthews, and Jack Hughes) Americans to have been chosen first overall in an NHL Entry Draft, along with Rick DiPietro (2000), Bryan Berard (1995), Mike Modano (1988), and  Brian Lawton (1983).

Having committed to the University of Minnesota, Johnson also became the first Golden Gopher and Minnesotan to be taken first overall. Despite the willingness to turn professional, Johnson was not signed to a professional contract with the Blues, becoming the first player in 44 years to play college hockey after being selected No.1 overall. In his freshman campaign with the Golden Gophers during the 2006–07 season, Johnson quickly established a top defensive role and accumulated 4 goals and 24 points in 41 contests to lead all WCHA rookie defenseman and earn a selection to the WCHA All-Rookie Team. Johnson concluded his collegiate career after his freshman year when he was signed by the St. Louis Blues to a three-year, entry-level contract on April 20, 2007.

Professional

St. Louis Blues (2007–2011)

Upon concluding his collegiate career, Johnson attended the Blues' Development Camp and 2007 Prospects Tournament. His first career NHL goal came on October 6 in a 5–3 win over the Los Angeles Kings. The goal was scored on a power play with 7:17 left in the third period and became the game-winning goal. After playing three games with the Blues, Johnson suffered a slight bone fracture in his foot. As a result, he was re-assigned to the Peoria Rivermen of the American Hockey League (AHL) on a conditioning stint. Johnson re-joined the Blues on November 7 but struggled to get back into the lineup. However, once he became a mainstay in the Blues' lineup he began a productive rookie campaign. By January, he tallied 16 points to tie for  10th amongst all NHL rookies and fourth on the team with a plus-10 rating. As such, he was selected for the NHL's 2008 YoungStars Game. As the season continued, his ice time fluctuated from a season high 22:0 to a season-low 11 minutes although he typically averaged 17 minutes per game. He finished his rookie season averaging over 18 minutes of ice-time per game to go with 5 goals and 28 assists in 69 games.

Following his rookie season, Johnson injured his right knee during the 2007 offseason which sidelined him for the first three days of training camp. It was later confirmed by the team's orthopedic surgeon that Johnson had torn his ACL and suffered a tear to his MCL. In November, Johnson underwent surgery successful right knee ACL surgery. After missing the 2008-09 season with a knee injury, Johnson returned for the 2009–10 season strong by setting new career-highs with 10 goals, 29 assists for 39 points. On August 2, 2010, as a restricted free agent, Johnson re-signed with the Blues with a two-year, $5.2 million contract.

In the first year of his newest contract, Johnson was named an assistant captain alongside David Backes, Barret Jackman, and Alexander Steen. Johnson tallied one goal and nine assists in 29 games before suffering a knee injury in December 2010.

Colorado Avalanche (2011–present)
 

Upon returning from his knee injury, Johnson was traded to the Colorado Avalanche, along with Jay McClement and a conditional first-round pick, in exchange for Chris Stewart, Kevin Shattenkirk and a conditional second-round pick. Later that day, Johnson made his Avalanche debut at the HP Pavilion at San Jose in a 4–0 loss to the San Jose Sharks. In his second game, Johnson faced his former team and posted his first goal as a member of the Avalanche in a 4–3 win. As a result of his goal against St. Louis, Johnson earned Avalanche "Play of the Week" award. He finished the rest of the season with three goals and seven assists for 10 points through 22 games. 

Johnson began the 2011–12 season healthy but was shortly placed on injured reserve in November due to a groin injury. Upon returning to the lineup in January, Johnson extended his assist/point streak to three games and led all Avalanche defensemen with 18 assists. As he remained healthy for the remainder of the season, Johnson finished the season by leading all Colorado defensemen in scoring with 26 points while averaging 20:50 of ice time per game. After signing Johnson to a four-year, $15 million extension, General Manager/Executive Vice President Greg Sherman said: "Since Erik’s arrival in Colorado, he has provided stability, size, and an offensive presence to our blueline...At only 24 years of age, we believe that Erik will continue to grow his game and we are thrilled to have him under contract."

On January 23, 2013, Johnson played in his 300th career NHL game. A few weeks later, it was announced that Johnson would remain out indefinitely after he suffered a head injury in a game against the Phoenix Coyotes. Upon returning to the lineup, Johnson recorded a career-high eight hits against the Dallas Stars, becoming the second Avalanche to reach this milestone since the league began tracking the stat in 2005.

Prior to the conclusion of the 2013–14 offseason, Johnson was told by head coach Patrick Roy to come back with less bulk and less weight. As such, he focused on mobility and agility and dropped 10 pounds. Upon returning for the 2014–15 season, analyst Ray Ferraro praised Johnson for becoming "aggressive without being careless." He continued to produce offensively and led all NHL defensemen with a career-high 12 goals by January. He also ranked first on the Avalanche in goals, average ice time, blocked shots, and power-play goals. As such, he became the first Avalanche defenseman to be selected for the NHL All-Star Game since Rob Blake in 2003-04. However, Johnson did not compete in the All-Star Game nor the final 34 games of the season due to a knee injury. Despite this, Johnson signed a seven-year, $42 million extension with the Avalanche.

Upon recovering from his knee injury, Johnson remained relatively healthy for the 2015–16 season and played in 73 games to reach the 500-game mark. He reached numerous milestones throughout the season including scoring his 50th career goal against the Dallas Stars on October 10, 2015. Nearly a month later, Johnson also reached 200 career points with an assist on François Beauchemin's goal against the Boston Bruins. He finished the regular season with 11 goals and 16 assists for third amongst Avalanche blueliners in scoring with 27 points. This marked the third straight season in which he ended the year as one of the top three scoring defenders on the team.

During the 2017–18 NHL season Johnson played in his 600th NHL game on December 3, 2017, in a 7–2 loss to the Dallas Stars. At the time, Johnson led the team, and was the fifth highest in the league, in average ice time at 26:24 minutes. Johnson was suspended for two games on December 17, 2017, for boarding Tampa Bay Lightning forward Vladislav Namestnikov.

On February 29, 2020, Johnson became the first defenseman from the 2006 draft to reach 300 points. He is the 37th US-born defenseman in NHL history to hit the 300-mark.

Four games into the 2020–21 season, Johnson sustained a concussion after a hit from Minnesota Wild forward Jordan Greenway caused his head to make contact with the ice. He missed the remainder of the regular season, and while he returned to practice during the 2021 Stanley Cup playoffs, Johnson was unable to play before the Avalanche were eliminated in the second round by the Vegas Golden Knights.

With the addition of the Seattle Kraken to the NHL in advance of the 2021–22 season, the 2021 NHL Expansion Draft was scheduled to be held. Each team had the opportunity to protect only a certain number of players, and Johnson was among the Colorado players contractually guaranteed protection in such a scenario. However, he announced that he would waive his no-movement clause, allowing the Avalanche to protect more of their younger defencemen from being selected. The Kraken did not take Johnson, opting instead for Joonas Donskoi. Due to a bout of COVID-19, Johnson missed the beginning of the season. On October 31, 2021, Johnson scored the game-winning goal of a 4–1 win against the Wild to mark his 12th with the team. Upon reaching this milestone, he moved into second place in franchise history in game-winning goals scored by a defenseman.

After three consecutive seasons of being eliminated in the second round of the playoffs, in the 2022 Stanley Cup playoffs the Avalanche reached the Western Conference Final for the first time since 2002. Facing the Edmonton Oilers, the Avalanche won the series in four games, advancing to the 2022 Stanley Cup Finals against the Tampa Bay Lightning. The Avalanche ultimately defeated the Lightning in six games to win the Stanley Cup championship on June 26, 2022.

International play

As a product of the US NTDP, Johnson first made his international debut for the United States at the 2005 World U17 Hockey Challenge. In the same year, he captured a gold medal as a 17-year-old at the 2005 World Under-18 Championships. Johnson scored ten points in six games the 2006 World Under-18 championships to help the U.S. retain the gold medal, and was selected as the Bob Johnson Award winner as the Best American player in international competition.

Johnson was a member of the U.S. junior team that won a bronze medal in the 2007 World Junior Ice Hockey Championships. He was named to the tournament's All-Star Team and was named the tournament's Best Defenseman. Johnson finished the tournament with four goals and six assists for ten points, becoming the first defenseman to lead the tournament in scoring.

Representing the senior U.S. team at the 2010 Winter Olympics in Vancouver, Johnson received a silver medal after losing in overtime to Canada in the final.

Johnson was chosen to participate in the 2016 World Cup of Hockey for Team USA.

Personal life 
Johnson's uncle is Sean Duffy, a Republican politician and former U.S. Representative for Wisconsin's 7th district.

In addition to his accomplished career as an NHL defenseman, Johnson is a proprietor and commercial racehorse breeder for ERJ Racing, LLC. He refers to his hobby as "my outlet away from hockey and my passion."

One of his racehorses, Landeskog, is named after his teammate Gabriel Landeskog.

Career statistics

Regular season and playoffs

International

Awards and honors

References

External links

1988 births
American men's ice hockey defensemen
Colorado Avalanche players
Ice hockey players from Minnesota
Sportspeople from Bloomington, Minnesota
Ice hockey players at the 2010 Winter Olympics
Living people
Medalists at the 2010 Winter Olympics
Minnesota Golden Gophers men's ice hockey players
National Hockey League first-overall draft picks
National Hockey League first-round draft picks
Olympic silver medalists for the United States in ice hockey
Peoria Rivermen (AHL) players
Stanley Cup champions
St. Louis Blues draft picks
St. Louis Blues players
USA Hockey National Team Development Program players
National Hockey League All-Stars